Paradoxus is a genus of moths of the family Yponomeutidae.

Paradoxus may also refer to:

Biology
It is used for species with unexpected features.

 Brachychiton paradoxus, a species of tree
 Cyrtodactylus paradoxus, a species of gecko
 Dilong paradoxus, a genus tyrannosauroid dinosaur
 Dissocarpus paradoxus, a species of shrub
 Helianthus paradoxus, a species of sunflower
 Hippocampus paradoxus, a species of seahorse
 Idiosepius paradoxus, a species of squid
 Lactarius paradoxus, a species of mushroom
 Lepidocyrtus paradoxus, a species of springtail
 Leucopaxillus paradoxus, a species of fungus
 Liaoningosaurus paradoxus, a genus of ankylosaurian dinosaurs
 Merluccius paradoxus, a species of fish
 Menemerus paradoxus, a species of spider
 Metoecus paradoxus, a species of beetle
 Metopides paradoxus, a species of beetle
 Ornithorhyncus paradoxus, a species of platypus
 Paradoxus osyridellus, a species of moth
 Paropta paradoxus, a species of moth
 Platerodrilus paradoxus, a species of beetle
 Saccharomyces paradoxus, a species of yeast
 Solenodon paradoxus, a species of solenodon
 Solenostomus paradoxus, a species of fish
 Variovorax paradoxus, a species of bacteria
 Xanthostemon paradoxus, a species of tree

Medicine
 Pulsus paradoxus, a blood pressure drop during inspiration

See also
 Paradox
 Paradoxa (disambiguation)
 Paradoxia, a species of green algae
 Paradoxides, a genus of trilobite